Thomas Woods was a Negro league third baseman in the 1940s.

Woods made his Negro leagues debut in 1945 with the Philadelphia Stars. Available statistics indicate he recorded 10 hits and eight walks in 70 plate appearances over 25 games for the club in his only professional season.

References

External links
 and Seamheads

Place of birth missing
Place of death missing
Year of birth missing
Year of death missing
Philadelphia Stars players